Solid Steel Presents Hexstatic – "Listen & Learn" is a DJ mix album, mixed by Hexstatic, released as part of the Solid Steel mix series.

The album cover features a Speak & Spell – an educational toy, which was popular in the 1980s.

Track listing
 "Telemetron" (Hexstatic Intro Dub) – Hexstatic
 "Streetcrawler" – Monophone
 "Mr. Scruff's Ninja Tune Megamix" (Hexstatic Edit) – DJ Food / "No, No, No" – Dawn Penn
 "Solid Steel Scratch School"
 "The Message" – DJ Grandmaster Flash
 "Funky Mule" – Ike & Tina Turner
 "Rip Rip" – David Holmes
 "Funky Kingston" – Toots & the Maytals
 "Jazzy John's Dub" – Stonebridge
 "Solid Steel Rock School"
 "Chrome Jam" – Trunk / "I'm Wild About That Thing" – Coldcut
 "Aquarius" – Boards of Canada
 "Easy Thing To Do" (Nightmares on Wax mix) – Shirley Bassey
 "Daily Intake" – Unsung Heroes
 "Wildstyle" – Timezone/ "Hip Hop be Bop" – Man Parrish / "Boogie Down Dub" / "Walking On Sunshine" (Acappella) – Rockers Revenge
 "Apache" – Michael Viner's Incredible Bongo Band
 "Know How" – Young MC
 "Do Your Thing" – Charles Wright & the Watts 103rd Street Rhythm Band
 "Home Shopping" – Bobby Trafalgar

References

Hexstatic albums
DJ mix albums
2003 compilation albums
Ninja Tune compilation albums